Anthony R. Suarez (born 1967) is a New Jersey attorney and has served as Mayor of Ridgefield, New Jersey since 2004.

Biography
Suarez was born in Englewood, New Jersey and was raised in Ridgefield. He graduated from Ridgefield Memorial High School in 1984. He then attended Saint Peter's College in Jersey City, graduating with a B.A. degree in 1988. He received a J.D. degree from Fordham University School of Law in 1993.

He was admitted to the New Jersey Bar in 1993 and the New York Bar in 1994. He is currently an attorney at the Fort Lee law firm Dario Yacker Suarez & Albert.

Suarez was elected to the Ridgefield Borough Council in 1998, and was reelected to the Council in 2001. He was elected mayor in 2003 and was reelected in 2007. He is the first elected Latino mayor in the history of Bergen County and the second Democratic mayor in the history of Ridgefield.

Operation Bid Rig
On July 23, 2009, Suarez was arrested as part of Operation Bid Rig, a joint operation of the FBI, IRS, and the U.S. Attorney's Office for the District of New Jersey into political corruption and money laundering. Suarez was charged with accepting a $10,000 cash bribe from an FBI informant through a middleman, Vincent Tabbachino, for assistance in arranging approvals to develop properties in Ridgefield.

Though the two other mayors implicated in the sting operation, Peter Cammarano of Hoboken and  Dennis Elwell of Secaucus, resigned following their arrests, Suarez rebuffed calls for his resignation, including from Governor Jon Corzine. On August 3, 2009, Corzine launched an investigation into whether the State of New Jersey should seize control of Ridgefield's finances. Targeting Ridgefield, Corzine also signed an Executive Order freezing development approvals in municipalities with chief executives facing corruption charges who have not resigned from office.

Suarez was acquitted on all charges on October 27, 2010.

References

External links
Suarez & Tabbachino criminal complaint, United States Department of Justice, July 23, 2009

1967 births
Living people
People from Englewood, New Jersey
Saint Peter's University alumni
Fordham University School of Law alumni
Mayors of Ridgefield, New Jersey
New Jersey Democrats
New Jersey lawyers
Operation Bid Rig
Hispanic and Latino American mayors in New Jersey
Ridgefield Memorial High School alumni